Nika Yellie Soon-​Shiong (born February 26, 1993) is an American activist who served as a Public Safety Commissioner of West Hollywood from September 13, 2021, to October 11, 2022. Founder of the Fund for Guaranteed Income, she is the co-director of the Compton Pledge and Long Beach Pledge programs.

Early life and career 
Soon-Shiong was born on February 26, 1993, to Patrick Soon-Shiong and Michele B. Chan; she has a brother. She graduated from Marymount High School in 2011.

In 2015, she graduated Phi Beta Kappa from Stanford University with an Master's in African Studies, Bachelor's in International Relations, and minor in creative writing.

Career 

After Stanford, she helped with Equal Education, an activist movement in South Africa, and worked in the office of the President of the World Bank Group. In 2018, she started her PhD degree at the University of Oxford.

In August 2020, Soon-Shiong founded the group Fund for Guaranteed Income and became the co-director of the Compton Pledge, an initiative by Fund for Guaranteed Income to have guaranteed income program in Compton, California.

Soon-Shiong became involved with the Los Angeles Times since 2020, when in June that year, she called out the Times for their use of "looting" in their headlines during the George Floyd protests, with the Times later limiting itself on its use of the word. That next month, when there were fears of layoffs, Soon-Shiong urged her father to meet with Black and Latino employees; the layoffs were never done. In February 2021, when the Wall Street Journal speculated that Patrick Soon-Shiong was looking to sell the Los Angeles Times, Soon-Shiong echoed told the Wall Street Journal in a tweet that they were "100% wrong." On June 25, 2021, it was announced that Soon-Shiong joined the Committee to Protect Journalists's board of directors.

On September 13, 2021, Soon-Shiong was appointed to the Public Safety Commission by West Hollywood councilmember Lindsey Horvath. As a commissioner, she advised the concerns of the citizens. She questioned the use of police in West Hollywood and pushed back against police in the city. Soon-Shiong was met with backlash, with Horvath responding to the backlash against Soon-Shiong saying it was "rooted in racism." In June 2022, the West Hollywood City Council voted to reduce the number of sheriffs in the city and replace them with unarmed security guards, a move which Soon-Shiong called "pragmatic and fiscally responsible," but said it "could have gone further."

In July 2022, Soon-Shiong announced that she would be stepping down as a Public Safety Commissioner in August 2022 to pursue a degree at the University of Oxford, which she had been in her third year of her PhD where she had been remotely enrolled. Columnist and radio host John Phillips wrote of her departure as not being "bothered to stick around and live with the consequences of her reckless actions," criticizing her for the rise in crime in West Hollywood during her tenure.

Publications 

 Soon-Shiong, Nika (2020) 'Public Procurement and Implementing Agents: The Middlemen in Charge of School Infrastructure Delivery in the Eastern Cape of South Africa'. Chapter 11: Public Procurement Regulation in Africa
 Soon-Shiong, Nika (2020) 'Using digital technologies to re-imagine cash transfers during the Covid-19 crisis', Digital Pathways Paper Series Pathways to Prosperity Commission.
 Soon-Shiong, Nika (2022) Enough Audits. Contract Cities Are Paying More for Less LASD Service. The Knock.
 Soon-Shiong, Nika (2022) LASD-Run Inmate Welfare Fund: Another Black Hole of Taxpayer Dollars The Knock.

References 

1993 births
Stanford University alumni
Living people
21st-century American women politicians
21st-century American politicians
Los Angeles Times people
American people of Chinese descent
Activists from Los Angeles
People from West Hollywood, California